The open government laws in Florida are focused on three areas:
Statutory public records↓ (codified at Fla. Stat. secs. 119.01 to 119.15 (1995)),
Statutory public meetings↓ (the Florida Sunshine Law, codified at Fla. Stat. secs. 286.011 to 286.012 (1991)),
Judicial access decisional law↓.

Open records 

The Florida Public Records Law states,

The statute expansively defines "public record" to include all

With equal breadth, the law defines "agency" as

A "public record" of an agency is subject to a broad legislated public right of inspection:

Furthermore, Sunshine Review notes that,

Going back to 1905, before the law was formalized, Florida courts have held that it is not up to the government to determine the use to which a person might put public documents once copies are received. [State ex rel. Davis v. McMillan]

Exemptions
The Florida Supreme Court has held that only statutory exemptions from the inspections provision of Chapter 119 may be recognized, Wait v. Florida Power & Light; although courts must give effect to competing constitutional rights where inspection would otherwise compromise them. Florida Freedom Newspapers v. McCrary.

The exact number of statutory exemptions to the open records law is hard to assess, but estimates exceed 200. In response to criticisms that Florida's public records law had been undermined by the many exemptions, the Florida Legislature enacted the Open Government Sunset Review Act of 1995. Fla. Stat. § 119.15. This "Sunset" law provides for the periodic repeal of all exemptions, and mandates periodic review of the specific criteria which should be considered when reviewing the exemptions.

Unless the legislative review demonstrates a compelling interest in retaining a particular exemption that has been enacted and the legislature reenacts the exemption, it is repealed automatically.

The 1995 Sunshine Review Act incorporates the provisions of Section 119.15 as the criteria by which legislators should review Sunshine Law exemptions. Fla. Stat. § 286.0111. Under the 1995 Act, an exemption must fit within one of three categories of identifiable public purposes, and must be seen as compelling enough to override the strong presumption of openness articulated in Fla. Stat. § 119.15(2).

Since the Sunshine Review Act, the legislature has exhibited a resolve to streamline exemptions, allowing confidentiality only to the extent necessary to protect important competing values.

Open meetings

Judicial access decisional law 

Similarly, access to judicial records and proceedings has been broadly granted by Florida courts.

See also
 Florida Man

References

Florida law
Florida statutes
Freedom of information legislation in the United States